Robertsonian translocation (ROB) is a chromosomal abnormality wherein a certain type of a chromosome becomes attached to another. It is the most common form of chromosomal translocation in humans, affecting 1 out of every 1,000 babies born. It does not usually cause health difficulties, but can in some cases result in genetic disorders such as Down syndrome and Patau syndrome. Robertsonian translocations result in a reduction in the number of chromosomes.

Mechanism 

Humans have 5 autosomal chromosomes with arms that are particularly discordant in length, known as acrocentric chromosomes. These are 13, 14, 15, 21 and 22. When these chromosomes break at their centromeres, the two resulting long arms may fuse. The result is a single, large chromosome with a metacentric centromere. This form of rearrangement is a Robertsonian translocation.

This type of translocation may involve homologous (paired) or non-homologous chromosomes. Owing to the acrocentric nature of the chromosomes involved, the long arms of these chromosomes contain the majority of genetic material contained on the original chromosomes. The short arms also join to form a smaller reciprocal product, which typically contains only nonessential genes also present elsewhere in the genome, and is usually lost within a few cell divisions. This type of translocation is cytologically visible, and can reduce chromosome number (in humans, from 23 to 22). However, the smaller chromosome carries so few essential genes that 
its loss is usually clinically insignificant.

Consequences

In humans, when a Robertsonian translocation joins the long arm of chromosome 21 with the long arm of chromosomes 14 or 15, the heterozygous carrier is phenotypically normal because there are two copies of all major chromosome arms and hence two copies of all essential genes. However, the progeny of this carrier may inherit an unbalanced trisomy 21, causing Down syndrome.

About one in a thousand newborns have a Robertsonian translocation. The most frequent forms of Robertsonian translocations are between chromosomes 13 and 14, 14 and 21, and 14 and 15.

A Robertsonian translocation in balanced form results in no excess or deficit of genetic material and causes no health difficulties. In unbalanced forms, Robertsonian translocations cause chromosomal deletions or addition and result in syndromes of multiple malformations, including trisomy 13 (Patau syndrome) and trisomy 21 (Down syndrome).

A Robertsonian translocation results when the long arms of two acrocentric chromosomes fuse at the centromere and the two short arms are lost. If, for example, the long arms of chromosomes 13 and 14 fuse, no significant genetic material is lost—and the person is completely normal in spite of the translocation. Common Robertsonian translocations are confined to the acrocentric chromosomes 13, 14, 15, 21 and 22, because the short arms of these chromosomes encode for rRNA which is present in multiple copies.

Most people with Robertsonian translocations have only 45 chromosomes in each of their cells, yet all essential genetic material is present, and they appear normal. Their children, however, may either be normal, carry the fusion chromosome (depending which chromosome is represented in the gamete), or they may inherit a missing or extra long arm of an acrocentric chromosome (phenotype affected).  Genetic counseling and genetic testing is offered to families that may be carriers of chromosomal translocations.

Rarely, the same translocation may be present homozygously if heterozygous parents with the same Robertsonian translocation have children. The result may be viable offspring with 44 chromosomes. Outside of humans,  Przewalski's horse has 66 chromosomes, while both of domesticated horses and the tarpan have 64 chromosomes and donkeys have 62; it is thought that the difference is due to a Robertsonian translocation.

Nomenclature

The International System for Human Cytogenomic Nomenclature (ISCN) is an international standard for human chromosome nomenclature, which includes band names, symbols and abbreviated terms used in the description of human chromosome and chromosome abnormalities. Abbreviations include rob for Robertsonian translocations. For example, rob(21;21)(q10;q10) causes Down syndrome.

Name 
Robertsonian translocations are named after the American zoologist and cytogeneticist William Rees Brebner Robertson (1881–1941) who first described a Robertsonian translocation in grasshoppers in 1916. They are also called whole-arm translocations or centric-fusion translocations.

References

Cytogenetics
Chromosomal abnormalities
Chromosomal translocations

de:Translokation (Genetik)#Robertson-Translokation (Zentrische Fusion)